In enzymology, a triphosphatase is an enzyme that catalyzes the chemical reaction

triphosphate + H2O  diphosphate + phosphate

Thus, the two substrates of this enzyme are triphosphate and H2O, whereas its two products are diphosphate and phosphate.

This enzyme belongs to the family of hydrolases, specifically those acting on acid anhydrides in phosphorus-containing anhydrides.  The systematic name of this enzyme class is triphosphate phosphohydrolase. This enzyme is also called inorganic triphosphatase.

References

 
 

EC 3.6.1
Enzymes of unknown structure